Clara Chung-wai Shih (born January 11, 1982) is an American businesswoman. She is the CEO and co-founder of Hearsay Social.

Early life and education 
Shih was born in Hong Kong. Her father, a math professor in Hong Kong, later became an electrical engineer in the United States at Argonne National Laboratory. Her mother was an art and special-education teacher. Shih and her family emigrated to Arlington Heights, Illinois when she was 4. In elementary school, she was initially placed in special classes for kids with speech impediments because the school did not have a program in English as a second language. In eighth grade, she scored a 1420 on the SAT out of 1600.

Shih attended Illinois Mathematics and Science Academy, where she participated in the women's varsity tennis team, orchestra, the student newspaper, the debate team, and the Mu Alpha Theta Mathematics Honor Society. She gave English lessons to immigrants. At 15, she helped develop materials in K-12 physics education at Fermilab. Shih was named the Presidential Scholar and graduated in 2000.

Shih attended Stanford University, and co-founded the Stanford engineering public service center. She was the president of the campus chapter of the Institute of Electrical and Electronics Engineers, officer in the Stanford Society of Women Engineers, and was elected to Tau Beta Pi Engineering Honor Society. In addition to her extracurricular activities, Shih founded Camp Amelia Technology Literacy Group, a nonprofit organization that creates software aimed at improving basic education in underserved communities in the United States and developing countries. She was named a Microsoft Women's Scholar and became an intern at Microsoft, where she developed the RSS news aggregator for Outlook. In her spare time, Shih volunteered in East Palo Alto, California and taught low-income elementary students to become interested in math, science and technology. She was also named a Mayfield Fellow in her senior year, a Merage Foundation for the American Dream Fellow, a Google Anita Borg Scholar, a Microsoft Women's Scholar, and a Society of Women Engineers Scholar. In 2002, Shih did field research for her honors thesis while attending Beijing Foreign Studies University. Shih majored in economics and computer science; she graduated with honors with a bachelor's degree and a master's degree in computer science from Stanford in 2005. She was an intern at Microsoft.

In 2005, Shih was awarded the Marshall Scholarship and attended University of Oxford. She received a master's degree in Internet studies from the University of Oxford Internet Institute.

Career 
After graduating from Oxford, Shih stayed in England and worked in corporate strategy at Google. Shih joined Salesforce.com in 2006 as a founding product marketer on the AppExchange. As a side project, she built a business application on Facebook, known as "Faceforce". The application turned out to be successful, and Shih recruited her old classmate, Steve Garrity, from Microsoft to develop Hearsay Social.

Shih has served as the chief executive officer and co-founder of Hearsay Social since 2009. In December 2011, she was also elected to the Starbucks board of directors, replacing Facebook chief operating officer Sheryl Sandberg.

Shih has received several awards for her achievements, including recognition as a Young Global Leader by the World Economic Forum, the Fortune 40 Under 40 (2012), and the Ad Age 40 Under 40 (2012).

In February 2021, after an 11-year hiatus, Shih rejoined Salesforce.com, the software-as-a-service customer relationship management company, as the company's CEO of Service Cloud CRM software business. In this role, Shih replaces Bill Patterson, who moved on to be the general manager of Salesforce's overall CRM software business.

Personal life 
Shih is married to health-tech entrepreneur Daniel Chao, and they live in San Francisco, California.

Published works

References

External links 
 The Facebook Era: Tapping Online Social Networks to Build Better Products, Reach New Audiences, and Sell More Stuff
 Stanford Engineering Interview

1982 births
Living people
American technology chief executives
Fortune (magazine) people
Stanford University alumni
Marshall Scholars
Alumni of the University of Oxford
American women company founders
American company founders
American people of Hong Kong descent
American women chief executives
Directors of Starbucks
Hong Kong emigrants to the United States
People from Arlington Heights, Illinois
American corporate directors
Women corporate directors
Google employees
Microsoft employees
Writers from San Francisco
Writers from Chicago
21st-century American businesspeople
21st-century Chinese businesswomen
21st-century Chinese businesspeople
American women engineers
21st-century American businesswomen